Taxobeni is a commune in Fălești District, Moldova. It is composed of three villages: Hrubna Nouă, Taxobeni and Vrănești.

Notable people
 Ilie Ilașcu

References

Communes of Fălești District
Populated places on the Prut